Howard's Inheritance is a historic home near Annapolis, Anne Arundel County, Maryland, United States. It is a -story gambrel-roofed brick house with a hall-parlor plan. The building appears to have been constructed as early as 1760, with interior finishes renewed about 1840. Also on the property is a 19th-century frame corn crib.

Howard's Inheritance was listed on the National Register of Historic Places in 1998.

References

External links
, including photo from 1996, at Maryland Historical Trust

Hall and parlor houses
Houses on the National Register of Historic Places in Maryland
Houses in Anne Arundel County, Maryland
Houses completed in 1760
National Register of Historic Places in Anne Arundel County, Maryland